Made in L.A. (M.I.L.A.) is the debut extended play (EP) by American R&B recording artist Mila J. It was released on October 14, 2014, by Motown Records. The EP features guest appearances by B.o.B, with the production, which was provided by DJ Mustard, among others. The EP was supported by two singles: "Smoke, Drink, Break-Up" and "My Main" featuring Ty Dolla Sign.

Background 
Billing herself as Mila J, she released her first single, called "Smoke, Drink, Break-Up" with the accompanied music video premiering on BET's 106 & Park. The song peaked at number 33 on the US [[Hot R&B/Hip-Hop Singles and Tracks chart|Billboard'''s R&B/Hip-Hop Airplay]]. On May 28, 2014, she performed the song at BET's 106 & Park. After the lead single release, she was featured on Trey Songz's Trigga for their song, "Disrespectful" and several other projects. She is currently working on an album entitled M.I.L.A., which stands for Made in Los Angeles''. She stated that the album will have a 1990s vibe to it and contains a lot of relationship-based songs such as "Pain in My Heart" and "Times Like These". B.o.B, Ty Dolla Sign, Problem are some of the features mentioned on this project. On August 27, she premiered the lyric video of her second single, "My Main" produced by DJ Mustard and features Ty Dolla $ign on her YouTube channel.

Singles 
The EP's first single, "Smoke, Drink, Break-Up" was released on January 29, 2014. The song was produced by Eric "Cire" Crawford.

The EP's second single, "My Main" featuring Ty Dolla Sign, was released on September 30, 2014, with the accompanied music video. Additionally, the production on the song was handled by DJ Mustard.

Track listing

Charts

References 

2014 debut EPs
Mila J albums
Albums produced by DJ Mustard